The Our Lady of Lourdes Cathedral or simply Cathedral of Maradi, is  a Roman Catholic cathedral in the town of Maradi, the third largest city in the African country of Niger.

It began as a parish church which was formally established on 10 April 1954. It follows the Roman or Latin rite and serves as the seat of the diocese of Maradi (Dioecesis Maradensis) which was created in 2001 by Pope John Paul II by bull "Summa diligentia" and is a suffragan of the Archdiocese of Niamey. It is under the pastoral responsibility of the Bishop Ambroise Ouédraogo.

The cathedral temporarily ceased its regular activities in January 2015 after attacks on churches that occurred in the country after the cartoons published by Charlie Hebdo.

See also
Roman Catholicism in Niger
Our Lady of Lourdes Cathedral, Daegu

References

Roman Catholic cathedrals in Niger
Buildings and structures in Maradi, Niger
Roman Catholic churches completed in 1954
20th-century Roman Catholic church buildings